Ferndale is a city in Oakland County in the U.S. state of Michigan. It forms part of the Detroit metropolitan area. As of the 2020 census, the city population was 19,190.
Ferndale is well known in the Detroit area for its LGBT population and progressive policies.

History 
Native Americans were early inhabitants of the area now known as the City of Ferndale. In the 1800s farmers began cultivating the land. After the invention of the automobile and the development of the automotive assembly line, the population of Ferndale increased rapidly.

Ferndale was incorporated into a village in 1918. It was then incorporated into a city on March 7, 1927, by vote of the citizens of the village. It became a bedroom community for Detroit workers, with most of its growth in housing from 1920 to 1951. Through the early 1950s there were trolley (interurban railroad) lines in the median strip of Woodward Avenue from downtown Detroit to Pontiac. These helped the northern suburbs of Detroit grow as bedroom communities as people could take the trolley to shop or work in Detroit.

In the 1970s, the Ferndale suburban community emerged as a place for families to raise children during the "Baby Boom" era, with its elementary schools, a downtown, city parks, active churches and civic groups. Ferndale High was completed in 1958.

Ferndale's downtown shopping area, 9 Mile Road, featured many busy, popular stores in the 1940s to 1960s, but later went into decline, and many business closed. In recent decades, the downtown area has revitalized. Ferndale's downtown is formed by two major thoroughfares, Nine Mile Road and Woodward Avenue. Circa 1997 the city made the downtown more pedestrian-friendly by narrowing West Nine Mile Road, the heart of the downtown, to one lane in each direction and adding on-street parking. The result has been a return of pedestrian traffic and an influx of new stores and restaurants. The city has continued to make itself more accessible to people by reducing traffic lanes on Hilton Road and Pinecrest Road, two major local north/south streets, and adding bicycle lanes.

Government 

Ferndale utilizes the council-manager form of government, and is governed by a city council consisting of a mayor and four council members. The city council appoints a city manager, who manages the day-to-day operations of the city. The current mayor of Ferndale is Melanie Piana. Current city council members are Raylon Leaks-May, who is also Mayor Pro Tem, Greg Pawlica, Kat Bruner-James and Laura Mikulski. The current city manager is Joseph Gacioch.

Geography 

Ferndale is adjacent to the cities of Detroit to the south, Oak Park to the west, Hazel Park to the east, Pleasant Ridge to the north, Royal Oak Township to the southwest, and Royal Oak to the north.

Ferndale is bordered to the south by 8 Mile Road, to the north (west of Woodward Avenue) by Oakridge Street, and (east of Woodward Avenue) by 10 Mile Road and I-696. To the west it is bordered by Republic Street (south of Nine Mile Road), and Hyland Street (north of Nine Mile). To the east it is bordered by West End, Pilgrim Street, and Lennox Street.

Demographics

2010 census
As of the census of 2010, there were 19,900 people, 9,559 households, and 4,349 families living in the city. The racial makeup of the city was 84.7% White, 9.6% African American, 0.5% Native American, 1.3% Asian, 0.1% Pacific Islander, 0.5% from other races, and 3.4% from two or more races. Hispanic or Latino residents of any race were 2.8% of the population.

There were 9,559 households, of which 20.4% had children under the age of 18 living with them, 30.3% were married couples living together, 10.9% had a female householder with no husband present, 4.3% had a male householder with no wife present, and 54.5% were non-families. 39.0% of all households were made up of individuals, and 6.8% had someone living alone who was 65 years of age or older. The average household size was 2.08 and the average family size was 2.85.

The median age in the city was 35.6 years. 16.5% of residents were under the age of 18; 8.3% were between the ages of 18 and 24; 41.2% were from 25 to 44; 25.2% were from 45 to 64; and 8.9% were 65 years of age or older. The gender makeup of the city was 49.9% male and 50.1% female.

2000 census
As of the census of 2000, there were 22,105 people, 9,872 households, and 5,103 families living in the city. The racial makeup of the city was 91.46% White, 3.42% black or African American, 0.55% Native American, 1.32% Asian, 0.02% Pacific Islander, 0.64% from other races, and 2.58% from two or more races.  1.81% of the population were Hispanic or Latino of any race.

There were 9,872 households, out of which 23.5% had children under the age of 18 living with them, 35.8% were married couples living together, 11.5% had a female householder with no husband present, and 48.3% were non-families. 35.2% of all households were made up of individuals, and 7.8% had someone living alone who was 65 years of age or older.  The average household size was 2.23 and the average family size was 2.97.

In the city, the population was spread out, with 20.4% under the age of 18, 9.1% from 18 to 24, 41.2% from 25 to 44, 19.7% from 45 to 64, and 9.7% who were 65 years of age or older.  The median age was 34 years. For every 100 females, there were 99.5 males.  For every 100 females age 18 and over, there were 97.8 males.

The median income for a household in the city was $45,629, and the median income for a family was $51,687. Males had a median income of $40,392 versus $30,859 for females. The per capita income for the city was $23,133.  About 7.2% of families and 8.2% of the population were below the poverty line, including 12.0% of those under age 18 and 9.6% of those age 65 or over.

LGBT population

The 1980s and 1990s saw the growth of the LGBT population in Ferndale, coinciding with a migration from neighborhoods in Detroit to communities north along Woodward Avenue, including Royal Oak, Pleasant Ridge and others. In 1999 a proposed non-discrimination ordinance was introduced in Ferndale, but was defeated. The Motor City Pride festival moved to Ferndale from Royal Oak in 2001. In 2006 the city passed an anti-discrimination ordinance protecting LGBT people from discrimination in public accommodations, housing, and business, with 70% in favor and 30% in opposition. Affirmations, a  LGBT community center in Downtown Ferndale, opened its new, expanded building on Sunday June 3, 2007, the same year the city elected the first openly gay mayor in Michigan. In 2011, Motor City Pride moved to Detroit's Hart Plaza. Ferndale Pride was started that year.

Media 
Church Militant  and Metro Parent Publishing Group  have their headquarters in Ferndale.

Crime 
The crime rate in Ferndale is relatively neutral. Crime is significantly lower than inner communities such as Detroit, Dearborn and Hamtramck, and its neighbors such as Hazel Park, Oak Park and Warren. However, other outer communities have a lower crime rate. Larceny theft was the most common crime in Ferndale, making up 51.7% of the crime rate. Six known homicides have been recorded in Ferndale since 2000; one being in 2001, one in 2005, one in 2007, one in 2008, one in 2009, and one in 2010.

Education 
Ferndale has its own school district, Ferndale Public Schools, including elementary, middle, and high schools. Ferndale High School and University High School are both part of Ferndale Public Schools.

A portion of Ferndale is instead zoned to Hazel Park Schools.

Notable people 
 James Blanchard, Governor of Michigan 1983–91 and U.S. Ambassador to Canada
 Joseph Bruce (a.k.a. Violent J), member of Insane Clown Posse
 Ron Carter, jazz musician
 David Coulter, Oakland County Executive
 Craig Covey, first openly gay mayor (2007–10) elected by voters in Michigan 
 Dana Elcar, actor best known for film The Sting and role as Peter Thornton on TV series MacGyver
 Elena Ford, heiress
 Frank Hagel, painter and sculptor
 Josh Malerman, novelist and singer-songwriter
 Rashad Phillips, professional basketball player; played for Ferndale High School (1992–96)
 Ken Rowe, MLB pitcher and coach; born in Ferndale
 Bob Welch, MLB pitcher, 1990 Cy Young Award winner, two-time All-Star, three-time World Series champion; lived in Ferndale, attended school in Hazel Park

See also
 Woodward Corridor
 LGBT community of Metro Detroit

References

External links 

 
 Ferndale Downtown Development Authority
 Ferndale Historical Society
 
 

Cities in Oakland County, Michigan
Metro Detroit
1918 establishments in Michigan
Populated places established in 1918